Vakhtangi Akhobadze (born 7 May 1993) is a professional rugby union player from Georgia. His position is Prop and he currently plays for Agen in the Top 14.

References

1993 births
Living people
Rugby union players from Georgia (country)
Rugby union props